Walter Whitman Moore, born 1959 in Virginia, is an American lawyer in Pasadena, California. He has run for mayor of Los Angeles twice, in 2005 and 2009. In 2009, he received over a quarter of the vote and came in second to Antonio Villaraigosa. At various times, he has been an Independent and a member of both major political parties.

Life and career
Moore graduated with honors from Princeton University in 1981, with a degree in Public and International Affairs from the Woodrow Wilson School. While at Princeton he was voted the "most outstanding senior in the American Whig Cliosophic Literary and Debating Society; president of the Woodrow Wilson Honorary Debate Panel; director of the on-topic program this year; Vendevelt award for most outstanding junior in his policy conference; and a David Lawrence scholarship, awarded by U.S. News & World Report, for his junior year." He subsequently graduated with honors from Georgetown University Law Center in 1984, and was an Editor of the Georgetown Law Journal. He passed the California Bar in 1984, and has been practicing law ever since then. Moore represents individuals, partnerships, and corporations in a wide variety of business disputes. He is also a licensed real estate broker.

Moore and his wife Judy, an international property manager, live in Pasadena and own a townhouse in the South of France. They have no children.

Politics

In 2009, Moore challenged Antonio Villaraigosa. Moore's mayoral platform included repealing the City's business income tax; ending what he called "corporate welfare" in the form of subsidies and special tax breaks for politically connected businesses; abolishing programs he considered wasteful (such as calligraphy and anti-gang programs that give tax dollars to ex-gang members); hiring enough police to make every neighborhood safe; opposing increased housing density; opposing rate hikes, fee hikes and tax hikes; and making the City's animal shelters "no kill."

In the 2009 election, Moore raised hundreds of thousands of dollars for his campaign, which was enough to qualify for matching funds. However, Villaraigosa raised 15 times more money, and received twice as many votes. Despite being relatively unknown at the time of the election, Moore received the endorsements of several organizations.

Besides running for mayor, Moore has written the official ballot argument against various City propositions that would raise taxes. He also wrote and gathered signatures to support "Jamiel's Law," a proposal to deny "sanctuary city" protection to gang members who are in the country illegally.

References

External links
 http://licensedtosue.com/

1959 births
Living people
Princeton School of Public and International Affairs alumni
Georgetown University Law Center alumni